Vahdettin İşsever (born 7 August 1968) is a boxer from Turkey, who won the bronze medal in the Men's Lightweight (– 60 kg) division at the 1996 European Amateur Boxing Championships in Vejle, Denmark, alongside Italy's Christian Giantomassi.

İşsever represented his native country at the 1996 Summer Olympics in Atlanta, Georgia. There he was stopped in the first round of the Men's Lightweight division by Algeria's eventual gold medalist Hocine Soltani.

References
 sports-reference

1968 births
Living people
Lightweight boxers
Boxers at the 1996 Summer Olympics
Olympic boxers of Turkey
Turkish male boxers